The Bermuda killifish (Fundulus bermudae) is a small fish which is endemic to the islands of Bermuda in the western Atlantic Ocean.  It belongs to the genus Fundulus in the killifish and topminnow family, Fundulidae.

It can grow up to 12.9 centimetres in length and 21.4 grams in weight. The male is dark green with a yellow underside and a dark spot on the dorsal fin when spawning. The female is brown or olive in colour, paler below.

It was formerly common in fresh and brackish ponds and marshes throughout Bermuda. It has a declined as a result of destruction and modification of its habitat by humans and was listed as a protected species in the Bermuda Protected Species Act of 2003. It is currently known from just seven ponds: Mangrove Lake, Trott's Pond, West and East Walsingham Ponds, Warwick Pond, Evan's Pond and an introduced population in Blue Hole Pond. The populations in Lover's Lake and Bartram's Pond are now thought to be a separate species, Lover's Lake killifish (F. relictus). Some other populations of Bermuda killifish may also be separate species.

Its omnivorous diet includes green algae, molluscs, crustaceans and insects. Its predators include herons, grey snappers and American eels, as well as the introduced eastern mosquitofish and red-eared terrapins.

References

Outerbridge, Mark E.; Davenport, John & Glasspool, Anne F. (2007) Distribution, population assessment and conservation of the endemic Bermuda killifishes Fundulus bermudae and Fundulus relictus, Endangered Species Research, 3: 181-189.
Species Profile of Endemic Bermuda Killifish

Bermuda killifish
Bermuda killifish
Fish of the Caribbean
Endangered fauna of North America
Bermuda killifish
Bermuda killifish